In physics, an open quantum system is a quantum-mechanical system that interacts with an external quantum system, which is known as the environment or a bath. In general, these interactions significantly change the dynamics of the system and result in quantum dissipation, such that the information contained in the system is lost to its environment. Because no quantum system is completely isolated from its surroundings, it is important to develop a theoretical framework for treating these interactions in order to obtain an accurate understanding of quantum systems.

Techniques developed in the context of open quantum systems have proven powerful in fields such as quantum optics, quantum measurement theory, quantum statistical mechanics, quantum information science, quantum thermodynamics, quantum cosmology, quantum biology, and semi-classical approximations.

Quantum system and environment

A complete description of a quantum system requires the inclusion of the environment. Completely describing the resulting combined system then requires the inclusion of its environment, which results in a new system that can only be completely described if its environment is included and so on. The eventual outcome of this process of embedding is the state of the whole universe described by a wavefunction . The fact that every quantum system has some degree of openness also means that no quantum system can ever be in a pure state. A pure state is unitary equivalent to a zero-temperature ground state, forbidden by the third law of thermodynamics.

Even if the combined system is in a pure state and can be described by a wavefunction , a subsystem in general cannot be described by a wavefunction. This observation motivated the formalism of density matrices, or density operators, introduced by John von Neumann in 1927 and independently, but less systematically by Lev Landau in 1927 and Felix Bloch in 1946. In general, the state of a subsystem is described by the density operator  and the expectation value of an observable  by the scalar product . There is no way to know if the combined system is pure from the knowledge of observables of the subsystem alone. In particular, if the combined system has quantum entanglement, the state of the subsystem is not pure.

Dynamics 
In general, the time evolution of closed quantum systems is described by unitary operators acting on the system.  For open systems, however, the interactions between the system and its environment make it so that the dynamics of the system cannot be accurately described using unitary operators alone.

The time evolution of quantum systems can be determined by solving the effective equations of motion, also known as master equations, that govern how the density matrix describing the system changes over time and the dynamics of the observables that are associated with the system.  In general, however, the environment that we want to model as being a part of our system is very large and complicated, which makes finding exact solutions to the master equations difficult, if not impossible.  As such, the theory of open quantum systems seeks an economical treatment of the dynamics of the system and its observables.  Typical observables of interest include things like energy and the robustness of quantum coherence (i.e. a measure of a state's coherence).  Loss of energy to the environment is termed quantum dissipation, while loss of coherence is termed quantum decoherence.

Due to the difficulty of determining the solutions to the master equations for a particular system and environment, a variety of techniques and approaches have been developed. A common objective is to derive a reduced description wherein the system's dynamics are considered explicitly and the bath's dynamics are described implicitly. The main assumption is that the entire system-environment combination is a large closed system.  Therefore, its time evolution is governed by a unitary transformation generated by a global Hamiltonian. For the combined system bath scenario the global Hamiltonian can be decomposed into:

The state of the system can then be obtained from a partial trace over the combined system and bath: .

Another common assumption that is used to make systems easier to solve is the assumption that the state of the system at the next moment depends only on the current state of the system.  in other words, the system doesn't have a memory of its previous states. Systems that have this property are known as Markovian systems. This approximation is justified when the system in question has enough time for the system to relax to equilibrium before being perturbed again by interactions with its environment.  For systems that have very fast or very frequent perturbations from their coupling to their environment, this approximation becomes much less accurate.

Markovian equations 
When the interaction between the system and the environment is weak, a time-dependent perturbation theory seems appropriate for treating the evolution of the system. In other words, if the interaction between the system and its environment is weak, then any changes to the combined system over time can be approximated as originating from only the system in question. Another typical assumption is that the system and bath are initially uncorrelated . This idea originated with Felix Bloch and was expanded upon by Alfred Redfield in his derivation of the Redfield equation. The Redfield equation is a Markovian master equation that describes the time evolution of the density matrix of the combined system. The drawback of the Redfield equation is that it does not conserve the positivity of the density operator.

A formal construction of a local equation of motion with a Markovian property is an alternative to a reduced derivation. The theory is based on an axiomatic approach. The basic starting point is a completely positive map. The assumption is that the initial system-environment state is uncorrelated  and the combined dynamics is generated by a unitary operator. Such a map falls under the category of Kraus operator. The most general type of a time-homogeneous master equation with the Markovian property describing non-unitary evolution of the density matrix ρ that is trace-preserving and completely positive for any initial condition is the Gorini–Kossakowski–Sudarshan–Lindblad equation or GKSL equation:

 is a (Hermitian) Hamiltonian part and :

is the dissipative part describing implicitly through system operators  the influence of the bath on the system.
The Markov property imposes that the system and bath are uncorrelated at all times .
The GKSL equation is unidirectional and leads any initial state  to a steady state solution which is an invariant of the equation of motion .
The family of maps generated by the GKSL equation forms a Quantum dynamical semigroup. In some fields, such as quantum optics, the term Lindblad superoperator is often used to express the quantum master equation for a dissipative system. E.B. Davis derived the GKSL with Markovian property master equations using perturbation theory and additional approximations, such as the rotating wave or secular, thus fixing the flaws of the Redfield equation. Davis construction is consistent with the Kubo-Martin-Schwinger stability criterion for thermal equilibrium i.e. the KMS state. An alternative approach to fix the Redfield has been proposed by J. Thingna, J.-S. Wang, and P. Hänggi that allows for system-bath interaction to play a role in equilibrium differing from the KMS state.

In 1981, Amir Caldeira and Anthony J. Leggett proposed a simplifying assumption in which the bath is decomposed to normal modes represented as harmonic oscillators linearly coupled to the system. As a result, the influence of the bath can be summarized by the bath spectral function. This method is known as the Caldeira–Leggett model, or harmonic bath model. To proceed and obtain explicit solutions, the path integral formulation description of quantum mechanics is typically employed.  A large part of the power behind this method is the fact that harmonic oscillators are relatively well-understood compared to the true coupling that exists between the system and the bath.  Unfortunately, while the Caldeira-Leggett model is one that leads to a physically consistent picture of quantum dissipation, its ergodic properties are too weak and so the dynamics of the model do not generate wide-scale quantum entanglement between the bath modes.

An alternative bath model is a spin bath. At low temperatures and weak system-bath coupling, the Caldeira-Leggett and spin bath models are equivalent. But for higher temperatures or strong system-bath coupling, the spin bath model has strong ergodic properties. Once the system is coupled, significant entanglement is generated between all modes. In other words, the spin bath model can simulate the Caldeira-Leggett model, but the opposite is not true.

An example of natural system being coupled to a spin bath is a nitrogen-vacancy (N-V) center in diamonds. In this example, the color center is the system and the bath consists of carbon-13 (13C) impurities which interact with the system via the magnetic dipole-dipole interaction.

For open quantum systems where the bath has oscillations that are particularly fast, it is possible to average them out by looking at sufficiently large changes in time. This is possible because the average amplitude of fast oscillations over a large time scale is equal to the central value, which can always be chosen to be zero with a minor shift along the vertical axis. This method of simplifying problems is known as the secular approximation.

Non-Markovian equations 
Open quantum systems that do not have the Markovian property are generally much more difficult to solve. This is largely due to the fact that the next state of a non-Markovian system is determined by each of its previous states, which rapidly increases the memory requirements to compute the evolution of the system. Currently, the methods of treating these systems employ what are known as projection operator techniques. These techniques employ a projection operator , which effectively applies the trace over the environment as described previously. For completeness, another operator  is defined so that  where  is the identity matrix.

One such derivation using the projection operator technique results in what is known as the Nakajima–Zwanzig equation. This derivation highlights the problem of the reduced dynamics being non-local in time:

 

Here the effect of the bath throughout the time evolution of the system is hidden in the memory kernel . While the Nakajima-Zwanzig equation is an exact equation that holds for almost all open quantum systems and environments, it can be very difficult to solve.  This means that approximations generally need to be introduced to reduce the complexity of the problem into something more manageable.  As an example, the assumption of a fast bath is required to lead to a time local equation: . Other examples of valid approximations include the weak-coupling approximation and the single-coupling approximation.

In some cases, the projection operator technique can be used to reduce the dependence of the system's next state on all of its previous states.  This method of approaching open quantum systems is known as the time-convolutionless projection operator technique, and it is used to generate master equations that are inherently local in time. Because these equations can neglect more of the history of the system, they are often easier to solve than things like the Nakajima-Zwanzig equation.

Another approach emerges as an analogue of classical dissipation theory developed by Ryogo Kubo and Y. Tanimura. This approach is connected to hierarchical equations of motion which embed the density operator in a larger space of auxiliary operators such that a time local equation is obtained for the whole set and their memory is contained in the auxiliary operators.

See also

 Lindblad equation
 Markov property
 Master equation
 Quantum thermodynamics

References

Unclassified references

External links 

 

Quantum mechanics